State Road 264 is a short two-lane road in southeast Dubois County in the U.S. state of Indiana.

Route description
State Road 264 begins at the north end of the town of Ferdinand at State Road 162, which is concurrent with Main Street.  Going east and slightly north, it is concurrent with East 23rd Street until it leaves the city limits after 0.7 miles.  It continues east-northeast and winds among several wooded areas until it reaches the Ferdinand State Forest.

Major intersections

References

264
Transportation in Dubois County, Indiana